Middlesex is a historic county in southeast England.

Middlesex may also refer to:

Places

Australia
Middlesex, Tasmania, a locality in Australia

Belize
Middlesex, Belize, a village in Stann Creek District, Belize

Canada
Middlesex County, Ontario

Jamaica
Middlesex County, Jamaica

United Kingdom
Middlesex County Cricket Club
Middlesex University
Middlesex (UK Parliament constituency)

United States
Middlesex, New Jersey
Middlesex, New York
Middlesex, North Carolina
Middlesex, Vermont
Middlesex, Virginia
Middlesex Township, Butler County, Pennsylvania
Middlesex Township, Cumberland County, Pennsylvania
Middlesex School, Concord, Massachusetts
Middlesex Canal, Massachusetts
Middlesex County, Connecticut
Middlesex County, Massachusetts
Middlesex County, New Jersey
Middlesex County, Virginia
Middlesex Middle School, Connecticut

Literature
Middlesex (novel), by Jeffrey Eugenides

Other
Middlesex Plat Historic District, listed on the National Register of Historic Places in Polk County, Iowa
Middlesex (1783 EIC ship), an East Indiaman of the British East India Company
Middlesex County Cricket Club